Gauriganj is a village and village development committee in the southwest corner of Jhapa District in the Mechi Zone of southeastern Nepal. It is in a flat agricultural district in the extreme southeast of Nepal, between Kadamgachhi, Hukkagachhi and Bhavanipur, only about 3 km from the border with Bihar, India.

References

 
Cities in Nepal
Metropolitan cities in Nepal
Metropolitan areas of Nepal
Populated places in Morang District
Populated places in Mithila, Nepal
Transit and customs posts along the India–Nepal border
Morang District
Municipalities in Koshi Province
Nepal municipalities established in 1953
Municipalities in Morang District
Nepalese capital cities